Godlike is the sixth studio album by American hip hop group Natas from Detroit, Michigan. It was released on May 21, 2002 via Number 6 Records, making it the group's first album to be released on a label other than Reel Life Productions, and their only release on Number 6 Records. Production was handled solely by Esham. The album peaked at #56 on the US Billboard Top R&B/Hip-Hop Albums chart, #35 on the Independent Albums chart, and #45 on the Heatseekers Albums chart.

Track listing

Personnel 
Esham Attica Smith – performer (tracks: 1-8, 10, 12-20), producer
Gary Reed – performer (tracks: 1-10, 12, 14-15, 18-20)
TNT – performer (tracks: 1-8, 10-12, 14-20)

Charts

References

External links 

2002 albums
Natas (group) albums
Albums produced by Esham